Great Books of the Western World is a series of books originally published in the United States in 1952, by Encyclopædia Britannica, Inc., to present the great books in a 54-volume set.

The original editors had three criteria for including a book in the series drawn from Western Civilization: the book must have been relevant to contemporary matters, and not only important in its historical context; it must be rewarding to re-read repeatedly with respect to liberal education; and it must be a part of "the great conversation about the great ideas", relevant to at least 25 of the 102 "Great Ideas" as identified by the editor of the series's comprehensive index, what they dubbed the Syntopicon, to which they belonged. The books were not chosen on the basis of ethnic and cultural inclusiveness, (historical influence being seen as sufficient by itself to be included), nor on whether the editors agreed with the views expressed by the authors.

A second edition was published in 1990 in 60 volumes. Some translations were updated, some works were removed, and there were significant additions from the 20th century located in six new, separate volumes.

History
The project for the Great Books of the Western World began at the University of Chicago, where the president, Robert Hutchins, collaborated with Mortimer Adler to develop a course there of a type which had been originated by John Erskine at Columbia University in 1921 with the innovation of a "round table"-type approach to reading and discussing great books among professors and undergraduates.—generally aimed at businessmen.  The purposes they had in mind were for filling the gaps in their liberal education (notably including Hutchins' own self-confessed gaps) and to render the reader as an intellectually-rounded man or woman familiar with the Great Books of the Western canon and knowledgeable of the Great Ideas visited in the "Great Conversation" over the course of three millennia.

An original student of the project was William Benton (later a U.S. senator, and then chief executive officer of the Encyclopædia Britannica publishing company) who in 1943 proposed selecting the greatest books of the Western canon, and that Hutchins and Adler produce unabridged editions for publication, by Encyclopædia Britannica. Hutchins was at first wary of the idea, fearing that commodifying the books would devalue them as cultural artifacts; nevertheless, he agreed to the business deal and was paid $60,000 for his work on the project.  Benton at first refused the deal on the basis that the set of works selected would be just that, artifacts, and never actually read.

By chance, Adler was re-reading a source he was using for a book he was writing at the time called How to Think about War and Peace. He noted to the person who had provided the book for him that, while he remembered reading this book as a source for the book he was writing, he had missed the instructive passage this person was pointing out to him and wondered why that had happened.  They realized that Adler had read the book focusing on one idea about war and peace and missed the particular significance and importance of the passage about a different subject.  Adler struck on the idea to accede to assume the task of producing an index for the whole set for Hutchins by means of which readers could have a sort of "random access" to the works, with the hoped-for result that they would develop a greater interest in the works themselves.

Failure to come to terms

After deciding what subjects and authors to include, and how to present the materials, the indexing part of the project was begun, with a budget of another $60,000.  Adler began compiling what his group called the "Greek index" bearing on the works selected from ancient Greece, expecting completion of the entire project within six months.  After two years, the Greek index was declared to be a resounding failure.  The inferior terms under the Great Ideas across the centuries in which the Greek-language works were written had shifted in their significance, and the preliminary index reflected that, the ideas presented not having "come to terms" with each other.

During those times, Adler had a flash of insight.  He set his group re-reading each work preliminarily with a single assigned subordinate idea in mind in the form of a fairly elaborate phrase.  If any instances of the idea appeared, they could collate them with co-ordinate ideas of a similar type collected the same way, use the material thus noted to better re-frame the larger idea structure and then finally start re-reading the work in its entirety with revised phrasing to do the complete indexing, of ideas.

Eventual popular success

In 1945, Adler began writing the initial forms of the essays for the Great Ideas and six years and $940,000 more later, on April 15, 1952, the Great Books of the Western World were presented at a publication party in the Waldorf-Astoria Hotel, in New York City. In his speech, Hutchins said, "This is more than a set of books, and more than a liberal education. Great Books of the Western World is an act of piety. Here are the sources of our being. Here is our heritage. This is the West. This is its meaning for mankind." The first two sets of books were given to Elizabeth II, Queen of the United Kingdom, and to Harry S. Truman, the incumbent U.S. President.  Adler appeared on the cover of Time magazine for a story about the set of works and its idea index and inventory of Western topics of thought at large, of sorts.

The initial sales of the book sets were poor, with only 1,863 sets sold in 1952, and less than one-tenth of that number of book sets were sold in 1953. A financial debacle loomed until Encyclopædia Britannica altered the sales strategy, and sold the book set through experienced door-to-door encyclopædia-salesmen, as Hutchins had feared; but, through that method, 50,000 sets were sold in 1961. In 1963 the editors published Gateway to the Great Books, a ten-volume set of readings meant to introduce the authors and the subjects of the Great Books. Each year, from 1961 to 1998, the editors published The Great Ideas Today, an annual updating about the applicability of the Great Books to contemporary life. According to Alex Beam, Great Books of the Western World eventually sold a million sets. The Internet and the E-book reader have made available some of the Great Books of the Western World in an on-line format.

Volumes
Originally published in 54 volumes, The Great Books of the Western World covers categories including fiction, history, poetry, natural science, mathematics, philosophy, drama, politics, religion, economics, and ethics. Hutchins wrote the first volume, titled The Great Conversation, as an introduction and discourse on liberal education. Adler sponsored the next two volumes, "The Great Ideas: A Syntopicon", as a way of emphasizing the unity of the set and, by extension, of Western thought in general. A team of indexers spent months compiling references to such topics as "Man's freedom in relation to the will of God" and "The denial of void or vacuum in favor of a plenum". They grouped the topics into 102 chapters, for which Adler wrote the 102 introductions. Four colors identify each volume by subject area—Imaginative Literature, Mathematics and the Natural Sciences, History and Social Science, and Philosophy and Theology.  The volumes contained the following works:

Volume 1
 The Great Conversation

Volume 2
 Syntopicon I: Angel, Animal, Aristocracy, Art, Astronomy, Beauty, Being, Cause, Chance, Change, Citizen, Constitution, Courage, Custom and Convention, Definition, Democracy, Desire, Dialectic, Duty, Education, Element, Emotion, Eternity, Evolution, Experience, Family, Fate, Form, God, Good and Evil, Government, Habit, Happiness, History, Honor, Hypothesis, Idea, Immortality, Induction, Infinity, Judgment, Justice, Knowledge, Labor, Language, Law, Liberty, Life and Death, Logic, and Love

Volume 3
 Syntopicon II: Man, Mathematics, Matter, Mechanics, Medicine, Memory and Imagination, Metaphysics, Mind, Monarchy, Nature, Necessity and Contingency, Oligarchy, One and Many, Opinion, Opposition, Philosophy, Physics, Pleasure and Pain, Poetry, Principle, Progress, Prophecy, Prudence, Punishment, Quality, Quantity, Reasoning, Relation, Religion, Revolution, Rhetoric, Same and Other, Science, Sense, Sign and Symbol, Sin, Slavery, Soul, Space, State, Temperance, Theology, Time, Truth, Tyranny, Universal and Particular, Virtue and Vice, War and Peace, Wealth, Will, Wisdom, and World

Volume 4
 Homer (rendered into English prose by Samuel Butler)
 The Iliad
 The Odyssey

Volume 5
 Aeschylus (translated into English verse by G.M. Cookson)
 The Suppliant Maidens
 The Persians
 Seven Against Thebes
 Prometheus Bound
 The Oresteia
 Agamemnon
 Choephoroe
 The Eumenides
 Sophocles (translated into English prose by Sir Richard C. Jebb)
 The Oedipus Cycle
 Oedipus the King
 Oedipus at Colonus
 Antigone
 Ajax
 Electra
 The Trachiniae
 Philoctetes
 Euripides (translated into English prose by Edward P. Coleridge)
 Rhesus
 Medea
 Hippolytus
 Alcestis
 Heracleidae
 The Suppliants
 The Trojan Women
 Ion
 Helen
 Andromache
 Electra
 Bacchantes
 Hecuba
 Heracles Mad
 The Phoenician Women
 Orestes
 Iphigenia in Tauris
 Iphigenia in Aulis
 Cyclops
 Aristophanes (translated into English verse by Benjamin Bickley Rogers)
 The Acharnians
 The Knights
 The Clouds
 The Wasps
 Peace
 The Birds
 The Frogs
 Lysistrata
 Thesmophoriazusae
 Ecclesiazousae
 Plutus

Volume 6
 Herodotus 
 The History (translated by George Rawlinson)
 Thucydides 
 History of the Peloponnesian War (translated by Richard Crawley and revised by R. Feetham)

Volume 7
 Plato
 The Dialogues (translated by Benjamin Jowett)
 Charmides
 Lysis
 Laches
 Protagoras
 Euthydemus
 Cratylus
 Phaedrus
 Ion
 Symposium
 Meno
 Euthyphro
 Apology
 Crito
 Phaedo
 Gorgias
 The Republic
 Timaeus
 Critias
 Parmenides
 Theaetetus
 Sophist
 Statesman
 Philebus
 Laws
 The Seventh Letter (translated by J. Harward)

Volume 8
 Aristotle
 Categories
 On Interpretation
 Prior Analytics
 Posterior Analytics
 Topics
 Sophistical Refutations
 Physics
 On the Heavens
 On Generation and Corruption
 Meteorology
 Metaphysics
 On the Soul
 Minor biological works
 On Sense and the Sensible
 On Memory and Reminisence
 On Sleep and Sleeplessness
 On Dreams
 On Prophesying by Dreams
 On Longevity and Shortness of Life
 On Youth and Old Age, On Life and Death, On Breathing

Volume 9
 Aristotle
 History of Animals
 Parts of Animals
 On the Motion of Animals
 On the Gait of Animals
 On the Generation of Animals
 Nicomachean Ethics
 Politics
 The Athenian Constitution
 Rhetoric
 Poetics

Volume 10
 Hippocrates
 Works
 The Hippocratic Oath
 On Ancient Medicine
 On Airs, Water, and Places
 The Book of Prognostics
 On Regimen in Acute Diseases
 Of the Epidemics
 On Injuries of the Head
 On the Surgery
 On Fractures
 On the Articulations
 Instruments of Reduction
 Aphorisms
 The Law
 The Ulcer
 On Fistulae
 On Hemorrhoids
 On the Sacred Disease
 Galen
 On the Natural Faculties

Volume 11
 Euclid
 The Thirteen Books of Euclid's Elements
 Archimedes
 On the Sphere and Cylinder
 Measurement of a Circle
 On Conoids and Spheroids
 On Spirals
 On the Equilibrium of Planes
 The Sand Reckoner
 The Quadrature of the Parabola
 On Floating Bodies
 Book of Lemmas
 The Method Treating of Mechanical Problems
 Apollonius of Perga
 On Conic Sections
 Nicomachus of Gerasa
 Introduction to Arithmetic

Volume 12
 Lucretius
 On the Nature of Things (translated by H.A.J. Munro)
 Epictetus
 The Discourses (translated by George Long)
 Marcus Aurelius
 The Meditations (translated by George Long)

Volume 13
 Virgil (translated into English verse by James Rhoades)
 Eclogues
 Georgics
 Aeneid

Volume 14
 Plutarch
 The Lives of the Noble Grecians and Romans (translated by John Dryden)

Volume 15
 P. Cornelius Tacitus (translated by Alfred John Church and William Jackson Brodribb)
 The Annals 
 The Histories

Volume 16
 Ptolemy
 Almagest, (translated by R. Catesby Taliaferro)
 Nicolaus Copernicus
 On the Revolutions of Heavenly Spheres (translated by Charles Glenn Wallis)
 Johannes Kepler (translated by Charles Glenn Wallis)
 Epitome of Copernican Astronomy (Books IV–V)
 The Harmonies of the World (Book V)

Volume 17
 Plotinus
 The Six Enneads (translated by Stephen MacKenna and B. S. Page)

Volume 18
 Augustine of Hippo
 The Confessions
 The City of God
 On Christian Doctrine

Volume 19
 Thomas Aquinas
 Summa Theologica (First part complete, selections from second part, translated by the Fathers of the English Dominican Province and revised by Daniel J. Sullivan)

Volume 20
 Thomas Aquinas
 Summa Theologica (Selections from second and third parts and supplement, translated by the Fathers of the English Dominican Province and revised by Daniel J. Sullivan)

Volume 21
 Dante Alighieri
 Divine Comedy (Translated by Charles Eliot Norton)

Volume 22
 Geoffrey Chaucer
 Troilus and Criseyde
 The Canterbury Tales

Volume 23
 Niccolò Machiavelli
 The Prince
 Thomas Hobbes
 Leviathan

Volume 24
 François Rabelais
 Gargantua and Pantagruel, but only up to book 4.

Volume 25
 Michel Eyquem de Montaigne
 Essays

Volume 26
 William Shakespeare
 The First Part of King Henry the Sixth
 The Second Part of King Henry the Sixth
 The Third Part of King Henry the Sixth
 The Tragedy of Richard the Third
 The Comedy of Errors
 Titus Andronicus
 The Taming of the Shrew
 The Two Gentlemen of Verona
 Love's Labour's Lost
 Romeo and Juliet
 The Tragedy of King Richard the Second
 A Midsummer Night's Dream
 The Life and Death of King John
 The Merchant of Venice
 The First Part of King Henry the Fourth
 The Second Part of King Henry the Fourth
 Much Ado About Nothing
 The Life of King Henry the Fifth
 Julius Caesar
 As You Like It

Volume 27
 William Shakespeare
 Twelfth Night; or, What You Will
 The Tragedy of Hamlet, Prince of Denmark
 The Merry Wives of Windsor
 Troilus and Cressida 
 All's Well That Ends Well
 Measure for Measure
 Othello, the Moor of Venice
 King Lear
 Macbeth
 Antony and Cleopatra
 Coriolanus
 Timon of Athens
 Pericles, Prince of Tyre
 Cymbeline
 The Winter's Tale
 The Tempest
 The Famous History of the Life of King Henry the Eighth
 Sonnets

Volume 28
 William Gilbert
 On the Loadstone and Magnetic Bodies
 Galileo Galilei
 Dialogues Concerning the Two New Sciences
 William Harvey
 On the Motion of the Heart and Blood in Animals
 On the Circulation of Blood
 On the Generation of Animals

Volume 29
 Miguel de Cervantes
The History of Don Quixote de la Mancha (translated by John Ormsby)

Volume 30
 Sir Francis Bacon
 The Advancement of Learning
 Novum Organum
 New Atlantis

Volume 31
 René Descartes
 Rules for the Direction of the Mind
 Discourse on the Method
 Meditations on First Philosophy
 Objections Against the Meditations and Replies
 The Geometry
 Benedict de Spinoza
 Ethics

Volume 32
 John Milton
 English Minor Poems
 On the Morning of Christ's Nativity
 A Paraphrase on Psalm 114
 Psalm 136
 The Passion
 On Time
 Upon the Circumcision
 At a Solemn Musick
 An Epitaph on the Marchioness of Winchester
 Song on May Morning
 On Shakespeare
 On the University Carrier
 Another on the same
 L'Allegro
 Il Penseroso
 Arcades
 Lycida
 Comus
 On the Death of a Fair Infant
 At a Vacation Exercise
 The Fifth Ode of Horace
 Sonnets (I, and VII—XIX)
 On the New Forcers of Conscience
 On the Lord General Fairfax at the Siege of Colchester
 To the Lord General Cromwell
 To Sir Henry Vane the Younger
 To Mister Cyriack the Skinner upon his Blindness
 Psalms (I—VIII & LXXX—LXXXVIII)
 Paradise Lost
 Samson Agonistes
 Areopagitica

Volume 33
 Blaise Pascal
 The Provincial Letters
 Pensées
 Scientific and mathematical essays

Volume 34
 Sir Isaac Newton
 Mathematical Principles of Natural Philosophy
 Optics
 Christiaan Huygens
 Treatise on Light

Volume 35
 John Locke
 A Letter Concerning Toleration
 Concerning Civil Government, Second Essay
 An Essay Concerning Human Understanding
 George Berkeley
 The Principles of Human Knowledge
 David Hume
 An Enquiry Concerning Human Understanding

Volume 36
 Jonathan Swift
 Gulliver's Travels
 Laurence Sterne
 The Life and Opinions of Tristram Shandy, Gentleman

Volume 37
 Henry Fielding
 The History of Tom Jones, a Foundling

Volume 38
 Charles de Secondat, Baron de Montesquieu
 The Spirit of the Laws
 Jean Jacques Rousseau
 A Discourse on the Origin of Inequality
 A Discourse on Political Economy
 The Social Contract

Volume 39
 Adam Smith
 An Inquiry into the Nature and Causes of the Wealth of Nations

Volume 40
 Edward Gibbon
 The Decline and Fall of the Roman Empire (Part 1)

Volume 41
 Edward Gibbon
 The Decline and Fall of the Roman Empire (Part 2)

Volume 42
 Immanuel Kant
 Critique of Pure Reason
 Fundamental Principles of the Metaphysic of Morals
 Critique of Practical Reason
 Excerpts from The Metaphysics of Morals
 Preface and Introduction to the Metaphysical Elements of Ethics with a note on Conscience
 General Introduction to the Metaphysic of Morals
 The Science of Right
 The Critique of Judgement

Volume 43
 American State Papers
 Declaration of Independence
 Articles of Confederation
 The Constitution of the United States of America
 Alexander Hamilton, James Madison, John Jay
 The Federalist
 John Stuart Mill
 On Liberty
 Considerations on Representative Government
 Utilitarianism

Volume 44
 James Boswell
 The Life of Samuel Johnson, LL.D.

Volume 45
 Antoine Laurent Lavoisier
 Elements of Chemistry
 Jean Baptiste Joseph Fourier
 Analytical Theory of Heat
 Michael Faraday
 Experimental Researches in Electricity

Volume 46
 Georg Wilhelm Friedrich Hegel
 The Philosophy of Right
 The Philosophy of History

Volume 47
 Johann Wolfgang von Goethe
 Faust

Volume 48
 Herman Melville
 Moby Dick; or, The Whale

Volume 49
 Charles Darwin
 The Origin of Species by Means of Natural Selection
 The Descent of Man, and Selection in Relation to Sex

Volume 50
 Karl Marx
 Capital
 Karl Marx and Friedrich Engels
 Manifesto of the Communist Party

Volume 51
 Count Leo Tolstoy
 War and Peace

Volume 52
 Fyodor Mikhailovich Dostoevsky
 The Brothers Karamazov

Volume 53
 William James
 The Principles of Psychology

Volume 54
 Sigmund Freud
 The Origin and Development of Psycho-Analysis
 Selected Papers on Hysteria
 The Sexual Enlightenment of Children
 The Future Prospects of Psycho-Analytic Therapy
 Observations on "Wild" Psycho-Analysis
 The Interpretation of Dreams
 On Narcissism
 Instincts and Their Vicissitudes
 Repression
 The Unconscious
 A General Introduction to Psycho-Analysis
 Beyond the Pleasure Principle
 Group Psychology and the Analysis of the Ego
 The Ego and the Id
 Inhibitions, Symptoms, and Anxiety
 Thoughts for the Times on War and Death
 Civilization and Its Discontents
 New Introductory Lectures on Psycho-Analysis

Second edition
The second edition of Great Books of the Western World, 1990, saw an increase from 54 to 60 volumes, with updated translations.  The six new volumes concerned the 20th century, an era of which the first edition's sole representative was Freud. Some of the other volumes were re-arranged, with even more pre-20th century material added but with four texts deleted: Apollonius' On Conic Sections, Laurence Sterne's Tristram Shandy, Henry Fielding's Tom Jones, and Joseph Fourier's Analytical Theory of Heat. Adler later expressed regret about dropping On Conic Sections and Tom Jones. Adler also voiced disagreement with the addition of Voltaire's Candide, and said that the Syntopicon should have included references to the Koran. He addressed criticisms that the set was too heavily Western European and did not adequately represent women and minority authors. Four women authors were included, where previously there were none.

The added pre-20th century texts appear in these volumes (some of the accompanying content of these volumes differs from the first edition volume of that number):

Volume 20
 John Calvin
 Institutes of the Christian Religion (Selections)

Volume 23
 Erasmus
 The Praise of Folly

Volume 31
 Molière
 The School for Wives
 The Critique of the School for Wives
 Tartuffe
 Don Juan
 The Miser
 The Would-Be Gentleman
 The Imaginary Invalid
 Jean Racine
 Bérénice
 Phèdre

Volume 34
 Voltaire
 Candide
 Denis Diderot
 Rameau's Nephew

Volume 43
 Søren Kierkegaard
 Fear and Trembling
 Friedrich Nietzsche
 Beyond Good and Evil

Volume 44
 Alexis de Tocqueville
 Democracy in America

Volume 45
 Honoré de Balzac
 Cousin Bette

Volume 46
 Jane Austen
 Emma
 George Eliot
 Middlemarch

Volume 47
 Charles Dickens
 Little Dorrit

Volume 48
 Mark Twain
 Huckleberry Finn

Volume 52
 Henrik Ibsen
 A Doll's House
 The Wild Duck
 Hedda Gabler
 The Master Builder

The contents of the six volumes of added 20th-century material:

Volume 55
 William James
 Pragmatism
 Henri Bergson
 "An Introduction to Metaphysics"
 John Dewey
 Experience and Education
 Alfred North Whitehead
 Science and the Modern World
 Bertrand Russell
 The Problems of Philosophy
 Martin Heidegger
 What Is Metaphysics?
 Ludwig Wittgenstein
 Philosophical Investigations
 Karl Barth
 The Word of God and the Word of Man

Volume 56
 Henri Poincaré
 Science and Hypothesis
 Max Planck
 Scientific Autobiography and Other Papers
 Alfred North Whitehead
 An Introduction to Mathematics
 Albert Einstein
 Relativity: The Special and the General Theory
 Arthur Eddington
 The Expanding Universe
 Niels Bohr
 Atomic Theory and the Description of Nature (selections)
 Discussion with Einstein on Epistemology
 G. H. Hardy
 A Mathematician's Apology
 Werner Heisenberg
 Physics and Philosophy
 Erwin Schrödinger
 What Is Life?
 Theodosius Dobzhansky
 Genetics and the Origin of Species
 C. H. Waddington
 The Nature of Life

Volume 57
 Thorstein Veblen
 The Theory of the Leisure Class
 R. H. Tawney
 The Acquisitive Society
 John Maynard Keynes
 The General Theory of Employment, Interest and Money

Volume 58
 Sir James George Frazer
 The Golden Bough (selections)
 Max Weber
 Essays in Sociology (selections)
 Johan Huizinga
 The Autumn of the Middle Ages
 Claude Lévi-Strauss
 Structural Anthropology (selections)

Volume 59
 Henry James
 The Beast in the Jungle
 George Bernard Shaw
 Saint Joan
 Joseph Conrad
 Heart of Darkness
 Anton Chekhov
 Uncle Vanya
 Luigi Pirandello
 Six Characters in Search of an Author
 Marcel Proust
 Remembrance of Things Past: "Swann in Love"
 Willa Cather
 A Lost Lady
 Thomas Mann
 Death in Venice
 James Joyce
 A Portrait of the Artist as a Young Man

Volume 60
 Virginia Woolf
 To the Lighthouse
 Franz Kafka
 The Metamorphosis
 D. H. Lawrence
 The Prussian Officer
 T. S. Eliot
 The Waste Land
 Eugene O'Neill
 Mourning Becomes Electra
 F. Scott Fitzgerald
 The Great Gatsby
 William Faulkner
 A Rose for Emily
 Bertolt Brecht
 Mother Courage and Her Children
 Ernest Hemingway
 The Short Happy Life of Francis Macomber
 George Orwell
 Animal Farm
 Samuel Beckett
 Waiting for Godot

Criticisms and responses

Authors
The choice of authors has come under attack, with some dismissing the project as a celebration of European men, ignoring contributions of women and non-European authors. The criticism swelled in tandem with the feminist and civil rights movements. Similarly, in his Europe: A History, Norman Davies criticizes the compilation for overrepresenting selected parts of the western world, especially Britain and the U.S., while ignoring the other, particularly Central and Eastern Europe. According to his calculation, in 151 authors included in both editions, there are 49 English or American authors, 27 Frenchmen, 20 Germans, 15 ancient Greeks, 9 ancient Romans, 4 Russians, 4 Scandinavians, 3 Spaniards, 3 Italians, 3 Irishmen, 3 Scots, and 3 Eastern Europeans. Prejudices and preferences, he concludes, are self-evident.

In response, such criticisms have been derided as ad hominem and biased in themselves. The counter-argument maintains that such criticisms discount the importance of books solely because of generic, imprecise and possibly irrelevant characteristics of the books' authors, rather than because of the content of the books themselves.

Works
Others thought that while the selected authors were worthy, too much emphasis was placed on the complete works of a single author rather than a wider selection of authors and representative works (for instance, all of Shakespeare's plays are included).  The second edition of the set already contained 130 authors and 517 individual works.  The editors point out that the guides to additional reading for each topic in the Syntopicon refer the interested reader to many more authors.

Difficulty
The scientific and mathematical selections came under criticism for being incomprehensible to the average reader, especially with the absence of any sort of critical apparatus. The second edition did drop two scientific works, by Apollonius and Fourier, in part because of their perceived difficulty for the average reader. Nevertheless, the editors steadfastly maintain that average readers are capable of understanding far more than the critics deem possible. Robert Hutchins stated this view in the introduction to the first edition:

Because the great bulk of mankind have never had the chance to get a liberal education, it cannot be "proved" that they can get it. Neither can it be "proved" that they cannot. The statement of the ideal, however, is of value in indicating the direction that education should take.

Rationale
Since the great majority of the works were still in print, one critic noted that the company could have saved two million dollars and simply written a list. Dense formatting also did not help readability. Nonetheless, Encyclopædia Britannica's aggressive promotion produced solid sales.

The second edition selected translations that were generally considered an improvement, though the cramped typography remained. Through reading plans and the Syntopicon, the editors attempted to guide readers through the set.

Response to criticisms

The editors responded that the set contains wide-ranging debates representing many viewpoints on significant issues, not a monolithic school of thought. Mortimer Adler argued in the introduction to the second edition:

Presenting a wide variety and divergence of views or opinions, among which there is likely to be some truth but also much more error, the Syntopicon [and by extension the larger set itself] invites readers to think for themselves and make up their own minds on every topic under consideration.

See also
 Gateway to the Great Books
 Syntopicon
 Other series of classics:
 Ancient Classics for English Readers
 Great Illustrated Classics
 Harvard Classics
 Loeb Classical Library
 Modern Library
 Oxford World's Classics
 Penguin classics (several articles)
 Sacred Books of the East
 Educational perennialism

References

External links
 Center for the Study of the Great Ideas  Mortimer Adler web pages with extensive discussion of the Great Books
 Greater Books – a site documenting lists of "great books," classics, canons, including the Great Books of the Western World
  (54 volumes.)

1952 non-fiction books
Encyclopædia Britannica
Great Books
Publications established in 1952
Series of books